CDVU+ (pronounced "CD View Plus") was a type of enhanced CD released by Walt Disney Company in 2007. It was essentially a revamped version of the Compact Disc (CD), and includes multimedia "Extras" on the disc. New features such as "digital magazine extras" like band photos, interviews, lyrics, and exclusive photos could be accessed by inserting the disc into a computer.

Announced CDVU+ releases

Jonas Brothers - Jonas Brothers, A Little Bit Longer, Lines, Vines and Trying Times
Jesse McCartney - Departure
The Cheetah Girls - The Cheetah Girls One World
Plain White T's - Every Second Counts, Big Bad World
Atreyu - Lead Sails Paper Anchor 2.0
Demi Lovato - Don't Forget, Here We Go Again

Cancelled CDVU+ releases
Hilary Duff - Dignity (re-release)

References

 (HR Press Release)
 (Disney Public Information of CDVU+)
 (Disney Press Release regarding CDVU+)

Compact disc
Disney technology